Kawahara Keiga (also known as Taguchi Takumi or Toyosuke, Nagasaki, 1786–1860?) was a late Edo period Japanese painter of plants, fishes, birds, reptiles, crustaceans, social scenes, landscapes and portraits at the Dutch Factory of Dejima, and at Edo, Kyoto and Nagasaki. His works can be found in museums in Japan (about a hundred works) and in the Netherlands (about a thousand), among others.

Career
Kawahara was born in Nagasaki as the son of the painter Kawahara Kozan. He studied with the painter Yūshi Ishizaki (1768–1846). With special permission from the Japanese government, Kawahara worked as a painter at the Dutch factory of Dejima, Nagasaki, from 1811 to 1842. At the request of successive directors at Dejima, Kawahara documented many aspects of life of Japan in general and at Dejima in particular. 

From 1823 to 1829, Kawahara drew and coloured detailed images of Japanese flora and fauna, at the behest of Dejima commander, physician and botanist Philipp Franz von Siebold. In 1825 Carl Hubert de Villeneuve (1800–1874) came to Dejima and taught Kawahara the fundamentals of Western painting techniques. As a result, Keiga introduced Western techniques in traditional Japanese painting. In 1826 he accompanied Von Siebold together with Heinrich Bürger during his visit to the court at Edo, and documented many objects, street and court scenes. In 1829, he was imprisoned by the Tokugawa shogunate for involvement in a spying incident of Siebold, who was subsequently expelled from Japan. 

In 1842, Kawahara was punished again, now for depicting the harbor of Nagasaki with family crests showing and therefore was dismissed from Nagasaki. In 1846 he put his signature on five ceiling paintings in the main hall of the Buddhist temple Wakimisaki Kannon, (now in Wakimisakimachi, Nagasaki-shi, Nagasaki). 

Kawahara's images have been fundamental for biological publications by Coenraad Jacob Temminck and Hermann Schlegel.

Techniques
Kawahara used watercolor-coloured pencil drawing on paper for his biological work. For other works he also painted on silk and wood, like his paintings on the ceilings of several temples in Japan.

Gallery of Kawahara's work

Museum collections with his work
For instance
 British Museum, London
 Fukuoka City Museum
 Nagasaki Museum of History and Culture
 Naturalis Biodiversity Center, Leiden
 SieboldHuis, Leiden
 Museum Volkenkunde, Leiden

See also
 Ukiyo-e

Sources

 Article Japanese Wikipedia
 Japanartsandcrafts.com Kawahara Keiga

Other external links and literature
 O-jewel.tumblr.com: Kawahara's botanical art
 Oijen, M.J.P. van: A short history of the Siebold collection of Japanese Fishes in the National Museum of Natural History, Leiden, The Netherlands. Catalogue of the Aquatic world of von Siebold. Nagasaki Museum of History and Culture, 2007
 Forrer, Matthi: Kawahara Keiga, Rijksmuseum voor volkenkunde (Leyde, Pays-Bas), cop. 1987
 Kawahara Keiga: Picture book Vol.2 “botanical art”, Far East Amur adonis

References

19th-century Japanese painters
Botanical illustrators
People of Edo-period Japan
1786 births
1860 deaths
People from Nagasaki
Buddhist artists
19th-century Japanese artists